Nister-Möhrendorf is an Ortsgemeinde – a community belonging to a Verbandsgemeinde – in the Westerwaldkreis in Rhineland-Palatinate, Germany.

Geography

The community lies in the Westerwald between Limburg and Siegen. Through the community flows the Große Nister. Nister-Möhrendorf belongs to the Verbandsgemeinde of Rennerod, a kind of collective municipality. Its seat is in the like-named town.

History
Both villages Nister and Möhrendorf had their first documentary mention in 1300. They were united in 1929.

Politics

The municipal council is made up of 8 council members who were elected in a majority vote in a municipal election on 13 June 2004.

Economy and infrastructure

Running right through the community is Bundesstraße 414, leading from Herborn to Hachenburg. The nearest Autobahn interchange is Haiger/Burbach on the A 45 (Dortmund–Aschaffenburg), some 16 km away. The nearest InterCityExpress stop is the railway station at Montabaur on the Cologne-Frankfurt high-speed rail line.

References

External links
Nister-Möhrendorf in the collective municipality’s Web pages 

Municipalities in Rhineland-Palatinate
Westerwaldkreis